RCA Country Legends is a compilation album by American country music artist Waylon Jennings. It is part of a series of similar RCA Country Legends albums released by RCA Records. It was released on November 6, 2001 and covers Jennings' biggest hits from 1965-1985.

Track listing

Critical reception

RCA Country Legends received a perfect five-star rating from Stephen Thomas Erlewine of Allmusic. In his review, Erlewine praises the album as an effective introduction to Jennings and an essential part of not only any country collection but any collection of American music of the 20th century.

Chart performance
RCA Country Legends peaked at #19 on the U.S. Billboard Top Country Albums chart the week of April 20, 2002 and #155 on the Billboard 200.

Weekly charts

Year-end charts

References

Waylon Jennings albums
2001 compilation albums
RCA Records albums